Nessie & Me is a 2017 American adventure comedy-drama film directed by Jim Wynorski starring John Henry Richardson, Walker Mintz, Jolie Ledford, and Michael Paré. Nessie & Me is in a shared universe with Wynorski's 2010 film Monster Cruise due to a good portion of that film's cast returning to their roles for this film.

Synopsis
A 9-year-old boy moves to a lakeside village and befriends a captain who claims a mythical sea creature named Nessie lives in their peaceful waters. When Nessie proves to be real, the boy embarks on a special mission to save the town from corporate villain Maxwell Gordon and prove that anything is possible if you just believe.

Cast

 John Henry Richardson as Captain Jack O'Grady
 Walker Mintz as Jamie Williams
 Jolie Ledford as Janelle Delacort
 Michael Paré as Tom, Dad
 Toni Hudson as Mom
 Paul Wallace as Larry
 Shay Dickerhoff as Izzy
 Erin Neufer as Ariel
 Kayla Gill as Tamara
 Corey Landis as James Grady
 Stacey Dixon as "Kitty"
 Hugo Gerth as Alfie
 Gerard Pauwels as Maxwell Gordon
 Jason Smither as Alphonse
 David DeSpain as Tony "Caput"
 Ervin Ross as Marve
 Jim O'Rear as Boris
 Dilan Patton as "Bobbo"
 Jonathan Tysor as Evan Kincaid
 Jordan Besana as Ronnie Alika
 Dennis Crosswhite as Mason
 Cindy Lucas as The Secretary
 Matt Borges as GPS Delivery Guy
 Freddy John James as Bobbo's Dad
 Brian C. Lauziere as Video Customer
 Rick Shedd as Fisherman
 Bryan Clark as Lawyer's Assistant

See also 
 The monsters from the following films are mentioned by the character Jack O'Grady when he encounters Nessie early in the movie. Those movies are not related to this film.
 Dinocroc
 Supergator
 Dinocroc vs. Supergator
 Piranhaconda
Monster Cruise - the characters Larry, Izzy, Tamara, Ariel, Kitty, Boris, Marve, Alphonse, and Tony Caput also appeared in this film directed by Jim Wynorski, with their respective actors and actresses reprising their roles in Nessie & Me.

References

External links
 
 
 
 Nessie & Me at Letterbox DVD
 Review at Dove Foundation

2017 films
Films directed by Jim Wynorski
Films about cryptids
American adventure comedy-drama films
American children's adventure films
American children's comedy films
American children's fantasy films
American fantasy adventure films
Children's comedy-drama films
2010s adventure comedy-drama films
Loch Ness Monster in film
2010s English-language films
2010s American films